Khwab is a 1980 Indian Hindi-language romantic thriller film directed by Shakti Samanta, starring Mithun Chakraborty, Ranjeeta Kaur, Naseeruddin Shah and Yogeeta Bali .

The film was loosely based on the 1951 film A Place in the Sun which itself is based on the 1925 novel An American Tragedy by Theodore Dreiser.

Plot 
Pratap Kumar Srivastav (Mithun Chakraborty) travels from Shyamnagar to Bombay, and is hired by his father's friend, Ram Prasad (Madan Puri). He rents a room in a Chawl in Borivali's 'Asha Manzil' where his friend, Gopal Mathur (Naseeruddin Shah) and his attractive sister, Maya (Yogeeta Bali) also live. Pratap's main aim is to succeed in life, become rich, and buy a flat in posh Malabar Hills. He succeeds considerably, woos his boss' daughter, Indrani (Ranjeeta) and is soon promoted to the position of Deputy General Manager. On the day of his engagement to Indrani, he goes missing, and subsequently she and her father are notified that he has been arrested and charged with the homicide of a pregnant Maya.

Cast 
Mithun Chakraborty as Pratap Kumar Shrivastav
Ranjeeta Kaur as Indrani Prasad
Naseeruddin Shah as Gopal Mathur
Yogeeta Bali as Maya (Gopal's sister)
Ashok Kumar as Advocate Joshi
Madan Puri as Ram Prasad (Indrani's father)
Sujit Kumar as Biharilal Khanna
Utpal Dutt as Public Prosecutor Dalaal

Soundtrack

References

External links 
 
http://www.ibosnetwork.com/asp/filmbodetails.asp?id=Khwab

1980 films
1980s Hindi-language films
Films directed by Shakti Samanta
Films scored by Ravindra Jain